Conotrachelus is a genus of true weevils in the family Curculionidae. It is a very large genus with well over 1,000 species, several of which are pests of fruit crops. Found from Canada to Argentina.

Species

Conotrachelus adspersus
Conotrachelus affinis
Conotrachelus albicinctus
Conotrachelus anaglypticus
Conotrachelus aratus
Conotrachelus arizonicus
Conotrachelus asperatus
Conotrachelus belfragei
Conotrachelus biscaynensis
Conotrachelus buchanani
Conotrachelus cameronensis
Conotrachelus carinifer
Conotrachelus carolinensis
Conotrachelus cognatus
Conotrachelus compositus
Conotrachelus confinis
Conotrachelus conotracheloides
Conotrachelus corni
Conotrachelus coronatus
Conotrachelus crataegi
Conotrachelus cristatus
Conotrachelus duplex
Conotrachelus ecarinatus
Conotrachelus echinatus
Conotrachelus elegans
Conotrachelus erinaceus
Conotrachelus falli
Conotrachelus fissunguis
Conotrachelus floridanus
Conotrachelus geminatus
Conotrachelus hayesi
Conotrachelus hicoriae
Conotrachelus humeropictus
Conotrachelus integer
Conotrachelus invadens
Conotrachelus iowensis
Conotrachelus juglandis
Conotrachelus leucophaetus
Conotrachelus lucanus
Conotrachelus maritimus
Conotrachelus naso
Conotrachelus nenuphar
Conotrachelus neomexicanus
Conotrachelus nigromaculatus
Conotrachelus nivosus
Conotrachelus obesulus
Conotrachelus pecanae
Conotrachelus posticatus
Conotrachelus pusillus
Conotrachelus recessus
Conotrachelus retentus
Conotrachelus retusus
Conotrachelus rotundus
Conotrachelus rubescens
Conotrachelus schoofi
Conotrachelus seniculus
Conotrachelus serpentinus
Conotrachelus setiferous
Conotrachelus similis
Conotrachelus texanus
Conotrachelus tuberculicollis
Conotrachelus tuberosus

References

External links

Molytinae
Curculionidae genera